Terence Dale Niño Baylon (born April 26, 1984) is a Filipino actor and model. He started making movies and commercials at the age of 7. When he was 4 years old, he joined Eat Bulaga! search for Little Mr. Pogi. Although he did not win the contest, his exposure gave him the chance to be discovered by an agent in charge of getting talents for modeling agencies in the Philippines. He is more popularly known as Junjun, Vilma Santos' autistic child in the movie, Ipagpatawad Mo. He was the Grand Slam winner for best child actor in 1992.

Biography

Early life
Terence Baylon is born in Cebu City, Philippines, the Queen City of the South. He is the eldest of 3 siblings.

Career
Terence Baylon used to be a child star with 3 major acting awards for best child actor in the film Ipagpatawad Mo. He won FAMAS, Film Academy of the Philippines, and STAR awards best child actor category in 1992. He is the only child actor who won 3 consecutive awards in a certain category within a year, earning him a grand slam title. At the age of 12, Terence Baylon quit show business in 1996 to pursue his studies.

Aside from being an actor, he also works as an IT Specialist. They have a talent center in Cebu which focuses on developing talented kids and teens in dancing, acting, and singing.

2005–2007
Making a return in the limelight using his real name, Baylon made a comeback movie titled I Wanna Be Happy together with Eddie Garcia, Cherry Pie Picache, Diana Zubiri, and Gloria Romero. He also appeared in the movie Twilight Dancers as a macho dancer. This film was shown internationally and was nominated in the Toronto International Film Festival. He was also cast together with Cristine Reyes and Mike Tan in the movie Barang. The trio must fight for their lives in this nail-biting supernatural thriller movie from the Philippines.

Terence Baylon appeared on Tweetbiz QTV Channel 11 second week of May. He is planning to make a comeback based on an interview with Justine, one of the host of the show.

Terence Baylon was invited by the Filipino community in Beirut, Lebanon to host a Christmas concert together with Amber Martinez. The show was a huge success.

GMA Network
He was also one of the cast in Now and Forever: Linlang together with Polo Ravales, Lorna Tolentino, Diana Zubiri, and Rudy Fernandez. He is Ricky in the said teleserye.

He was one of the challengers together with his partner Diana Zubiri in Extra Challenge hosted by Paolo Bediones. The episode was titled pakners.

ABS-CBN Network
Baylon made a comeback in 2013 and portrayed the role of a hunk driver in the top-rating series, Be Careful With My Heart.

Filmography

Film

Television

Awards and nominations

External links
 
Terence Baylon at Hollywood Movie Database

1984 births
Living people
GMA Network personalities
Filipino male child actors
Filipino male television actors
Male actors from Cebu
Filipino male film actors